Lancinet Sidibe (born 1 January 1997) is a Guinean footballer who plays for Sektzia Ness Ziona.

Honours
Tirana
 Albanian Superliga: 2019–20

References

1997 births
Living people
People from Kankan
Association football defenders
Guinean footballers
KF Luz i Vogël 2008 players
Flamurtari Vlorë players
KF Teuta Durrës players
Besëlidhja Lezhë players
Ermis Aradippou FC players
Sektzia Ness Ziona F.C. players
Kategoria e Parë players
Kategoria e Dytë players
Cypriot First Division players
Guinean expatriate footballers
Expatriate footballers in Albania
Expatriate footballers in Cyprus
Expatriate footballers in Israel
Guinean expatriate sportspeople in Albania
Guinean expatriate sportspeople in Cyprus
Guinean expatriate sportspeople in Israel